2nd Congress may refer to:
2nd Congress of the Philippines (1949–1953)
2nd Congress of the Russian Social Democratic Labour Party (1903)
2nd Congress of the Workers' Party of North Korea (1948)
2nd National Congress of the Chinese Communist Party (1922)
2nd Congress of the Communist Party of India (1948)
2nd National Congress of the Kuomintang (1926)
2nd National Congress of the Lao People's Revolutionary Party (1972)
2nd National People's Congress (1959–1964)
2nd United States Congress (1791–1793)
2nd World Congress of the Comintern (1920)
International Socialist Labor Congress of Brussels, 1891, the 2nd Congress of the Second International
Lausanne Congress (1867), the 2nd Congress of the First International